Scientist Rebellion is an international scientists' environmentalist group that campaigns for degrowth, climate justice and more effective climate change mitigation. It is a sister organisation to Extinction Rebellion.

It is a network of academics that tries to raise awareness by engaging in non-violent civil disobedience.

Actions
The group was established around September 2020. Scientist Rebellion has carried out various protests during COP26. On 6 November 2021, activists blocked George V Bridge, Glasgow. In April 2022, they blocked roads in Berlin in protest against oil extraction in the North Sea.

In August 2021, the group leaked parts of the pre-final Working Group III contribution to the Sixth Assessment Report (AR6) prior to intergovernmental approval.

Debate and impact
Several researchers affiliated with the movement (six overall) have argued for civil disobedience by colleagues in a commentary behind a paywall, hypothesizing that such may cause significant pro-climate net changes of public opinion due to "potential to cut through the myriad complexities and confusion" in the public, receiving substantial coverage by online text-based news media.

See also
Extinction Rebellion

References

External links
Scientist Rebellion homepage
Scientist Rebellion Netherlands
Scientist Rebellion Spain

Climate change organizations
Civil disobedience
Extinction Rebellion
Climate change protests